Michel Lezeau (born December 20, 1942 in Orléans) is a member of the National Assembly of France.  He represents the Indre-et-Loire department, and is a member of the Union for a Popular Movement.

References

1942 births
Living people
Politicians from Orléans
Union for a Popular Movement politicians
Deputies of the 13th National Assembly of the French Fifth Republic